Barnhartia is a genus of flowering plants belonging to the family Polygalaceae.

Its native range is Northern South America to Northern Brazil.

Species:

Barnhartia floribunda

References

Polygalaceae
Fabales genera